Minuscule 203 (in the Gregory-Aland numbering), α 203 (Soden), is a modern Greek minuscule manuscript of the New Testament, on parchment. Paleographically it has been assigned to the 12th century.

Description 

The codex contains the text of the New Testament (except Gospels) on 149 parchment leaves (size ), with some lacunae. The order of books: Pauline epistles, Acts of the Apostles, Catholic epistles, Apocalypse. It contains non-biblical material at the end with a list of the errors condemned by the Seven Ecumenical Councils.

It is written in one column per page, in 32-33 lines per page.

It has Euthalian Apparatus.

Text 

The Greek text of the codex is a representative of the Byzantine text-type. Aland placed it in Category V.

History 

The scribe of the codex was named Andreas.

It was examined by Birch and Scholz. C. R. Gregory saw it in 1886. 

It is currently housed at the British Library (Add MS 28816), in London.

See also 

 List of New Testament minuscules
 Biblical manuscript
 Textual criticism

References

Further reading

External links 
 
 Minuscule 203 at the Encyclopedia of Textual Criticism

Greek New Testament minuscules
12th-century biblical manuscripts